The Tardoire is a river in southwestern France, left tributary to the river Bonnieure. Its source is in Châlus, in the Haute-Vienne département. It flows into the Bonnieure near Saint-Ciers-sur-Bonnieure. Over much of its length, the Tardoire flows underground. Its largest tributary is the Bandiat.

It flows through the following départements and towns:

Haute-Vienne: Châlus, Cussac 
Charente: Montbron, La Rochefoucauld, Rivières (a small municipality next to La Rochefoucauld)

References

Rivers of France
Rivers of Nouvelle-Aquitaine
Rivers of Haute-Vienne
Rivers of Charente